The Women's 30 kilometre classical at the FIS Nordic World Ski Championships 2013 was held on 2 March 2013.

Results
The race was started at 12:15.

References

FIS Nordic World Ski Championships 2013
2013 in Italian women's sport